The 2004 NBA Finals was the championship round of the 2003–04 National Basketball Association (NBA) season, and the conclusion of the season's playoffs. This season's NBA Finals was contested between the Western Conference playoff champion Los Angeles Lakers and the Eastern Conference playoff champion Detroit Pistons. The Lakers held home court advantage, and the series was played under a best-of-seven format.

Although the Lakers, headed by Kobe Bryant and Shaquille O'Neal, were considered the heavy favorites, the Pistons handily won the series in five games. This win marked the Pistons' fifth win overall as a franchise (including two NBL championships: in 1944 and 1945 as the Fort Wayne Pistons) as well as its first NBA title since two 1989–90 NBA championship seasons which was nearly fifteen years prior. The series ultimately featured the perceived underdog Pistons dominating a Lakers team composed of four future Hall of Famers.

Pistons' owner William Davidson became the first owner in American sports history to win two championships in one calendar year; eight days earlier, his Tampa Bay Lightning defeated the Calgary Flames to win the NHL Stanley Cup Finals in seven games.

Background

Los Angeles Lakers

The Lakers had won three consecutive championships from 2000 to 2002 but lost to the eventual champions, the San Antonio Spurs, in the Western Conference Semifinals in 2003 to end their streak at three. The Spurs beat the Lakers in 6 games.

In the 2003 offseason, the Lakers made major changes with initially varying results. Needing to find a point guard and a power forward to defend against Tim Duncan and the Spurs, the Lakers signed veteran stars Gary Payton and Karl Malone for well below market value; they also hoped to give both veterans their first championship ring. The Lakers were afterwards considered the favorites to win the NBA title.

During the regular season, after starting the season 18–3, the Lakers were afflicted by numerous injuries and stumbled to a 56–26 record to finish the season with the second seed in the Western Conference.

The Lakers breezed past their first-round opponent, the Houston Rockets, headlining a matchup between Shaquille O'Neal and a young Yao Ming. They defeated the squad 4–1 but then lost the first two games in their series against the Spurs before a dramatic comeback that saw them win 4–2. They then faced the Minnesota Timberwolves and league MVP Kevin Garnett. The Lakers won the series 4–2 to advance to the Finals.

Detroit Pistons

The Pistons won two back-to-back championships in 1989 and 1990, but with retirements and departures of several stars, they faded from relevance. The team hired former star Joe Dumars as general manager of the team in 2000, and he began stockpiling draft picks and trading players. He landed defensive stalwart Ben Wallace and guard Richard Hamilton by trading established stars in controversial trades, signed Chauncey Billups who was considered an underachiever, and drafted Tayshaun Prince with the 23rd pick in the 2002 Draft. He was named the NBA Executive of the Year in 2003 for returning the Pistons to prominence.

The Pistons made another major—perhaps, riskier—coaching change, firing head coach Rick Carlisle, who had led the Pistons to consecutive Central Division titles, 100 regular season wins, and had received the NBA Coach of the Year Award in 2002. In his place, Dumars hired legendary coach Larry Brown, who had most recently led the Philadelphia 76ers to the NBA Finals in 2001 against the Lakers.

In a three-team trade involving the Boston Celtics and Atlanta Hawks at the trade deadline, Dumars traded Chucky Atkins, Lindsey Hunter, Bobby Sura, Željko Rebrača, and other considerations for guard Mike James and forward Rasheed Wallace, who had been traded from the Portland Trail Blazers to the Hawks and then to the Pistons at the trade deadline. They proved to be the final pieces of the championship team. Lindsey Hunter would rejoin the Pistons a week later after being waived by the Celtics and be partnered with Mike James to create a formidable guard tandem off the bench dubbed "The Pit Bulls". They became the first team in NBA history to hold five consecutive opponents under 70 points, and finished the season with a 54–28 record and the third seed in the Eastern Conference.

The Pistons easily overcame the Milwaukee Bucks 4–1 but struggled against the defending conference champion New Jersey Nets. After splitting the first four games of the series, the Nets won Game 5 in Detroit in triple overtime to take a 3–2 series lead back to New Jersey. After falling behind by 12 early in Game 6, the Pistons stormed back in the second quarter and held on for an 81-75 victory to force a seventh game. The Pistons never trailed after the midway point of the first quarter and cruised to a 90–69 win to take the series.

In the Eastern Conference Finals, a match up with the 61-win, Carlisle-led Indiana Pacers, the Pistons faltered in the final 90 seconds of Game 1, falling 78–74. In Game 2, Rasheed Wallace almost squandered a Detroit lead. With Detroit clinging to a 69–67 lead with under 30 seconds to play, Billups recovered the basketball after a Jermaine O'Neal blocked shot of Rasheed Wallace. Jamaal Tinsley stripped Billups and found Reggie Miller open down the court for what appeared to be the tying lay-up. As Miller approached the basket, Tayshaun Prince ran in from the left wing and blocked Miller's lay-up as it left his fingertips. Richard Hamilton recovered the loose ball before it went out of bounds and was fouled by Tinsley. Hamilton would make three free throws in the game's final 15 seconds to seal the victory 72–67 and tie the series. The Pistons rode the momentum of Game 2, including dominant wins in Games 3 and 5, to a 4–2 series victory, advancing to the NBA Finals for the first time in 14 years.

Road to the Finals

Regular season series
The teams split the two meetings, each won by the home team:

Team rosters

Detroit Pistons

Los Angeles Lakers

Series summary

The Finals were played using a 2–3–2 site format, where the first two and last two games are held at the team with home court advantage. This format was only used in the Finals; all other playoff series were held in a 2–2–1–1–1 format (the team with home court advantage starts).

The Pistons became the fourth team to sweep the middle three games since the NBA started using the 2-3-2 format in 1985, but the first to do so at home; the previous three times this had occurred, it was done by away teams (1990 Pistons, 1991 Chicago Bulls, 2001 Lakers). This feat would later be accomplished by two more teams (the 2006 and 2012 Heat, both on their home floor) before the Finals reverted to 2-2-1-1-1 format in 2014.

This was the first Finals series to be played on a Sunday–Tuesday–Thursday rotation since 1990, the last year CBS had the NBA's national television contract. NBC switched to a Wednesday-Friday-Sunday rotation in 1991, which was used through 2003, save for Monday games in 1999 and 2000 (and a potential Tuesday game in 1999, had that Finals reached 7 games). It is also the last series to have Game 1 be played on a Sunday. Since 2005, Game 1 has been played on a Thursday each year, with the exceptions of 2011 and 2012, when it was played on a Tuesday.

Features
The NBA heavily publicized the series as it has done with all other NBA Finals series. There was a sentiment among fans that the Pistons were the clear underdogs, and many described the series as a David vs. Goliath match-up. The Lakers had a lineup of Stars such as Karl Malone, Gary Payton, Kobe Bryant, and Shaquille O'Neal—their offensive capability was expected to overpower Detroit's defensive-based game plan.

Payton and Malone also added to the publicity of the Finals. Perennial All-Stars who had both previously reached the Finals, Payton had led the Seattle SuperSonics there in 1996, while Malone had led the Utah Jazz there in 1997 and 1998. However, the Michael Jordan-led Chicago Bulls denied them championship rings a total of three times. By the time of Jordan's second retirement in 1998, the two veterans were aged and failed to lead their teams deep into the playoffs. It would be Malone's final chance to win a championship, as he would retire before the subsequent season.

Game summaries
All times are in Eastern Daylight Time (UTC−4). If the venue is located in a different time zone, the local time is also given.

Game 1

Considered to be a stunning upset by most of the NBA world, the Detroit Pistons managed to defeat the Lakers with imposing defense. Defensively clamping down on everyone but Bryant and O'Neal, the Pistons managed to hold everyone else to a total of 16 points. O'Neal recorded 34 points and 11 rebounds for the Lakers.

The Pistons trailed the Lakers 41–40 at halftime, but by the fourth quarter the Pistons had opened up a 13-point lead; they would not trail for the rest of the game. The Pistons outscored the Lakers 47 to 34 in the 2nd half as they got the road win in Los Angeles. Chauncey Billups recorded 22 points, 4 assists, and 3 steals to fuel his team towards the win.

Game 2

In Game 2, the Lakers had an 8-point lead at halftime, 44–36. However, in the third quarter, the Pistons scored 30 points, cutting the deficit to 68–66. Detroit took the lead on a Lindsay Hunter three-pointer, 71–68. However, the Lakers went on a 7-0 run to regain the lead with 7:00 remaining in the fourth quarter. With 47 seconds remaining, Ben Wallace made a putback to give the Pistons a 6-point advantage. The next play, Kobe Bryant missed a 3-pointer but O'Neal was there to grab the offensive board and made an and-1 to cut the deficit to 3. The Pistons led by three points with 10.9 seconds remaining in the final period. Coach Brown wanted to foul a Lakers player where they could get only 2 points rather than 3. However, the Pistons' veterans only wanted to intentionally foul O'Neal. Kobe Bryant's 3-point shot with 2.1 seconds left in the fourth quarter would force overtime, where the Pistons would make only one two-point field goal (compared to Los Angeles scoring ten points). Afterwards, on the team bus back to the airport, Billups told the Pistons' players and coaches, "We're not coming back to L.A."

Game 3

In Game 3, the Pistons were on fire to start. They started the game on a 10–2 run. At halftime, the Pistons led by seven, 39–32. The Pistons beat Los Angeles by 20 in their first NBA Finals appearance together at The Palace of Auburn Hills since 1990 to take a 2–1 lead in the series. The 68 points scored by the Lakers set a franchise record for the lowest number of points scored in a playoff game. Tayshaun Prince and the Pistons' defense were able to hold Kobe Bryant to 11 points on 4/13 (.308%) shooting, with Bryant going scoreless in the first half.

Game 4

Again, the Pistons defeated the Lakers, although this time by eight, to take a 3–1 series advantage.

O'Neal scored 36 for the Lakers and Bryant scored 20 but shot 32 percent from the field.

Karl Malone would play his last game, as a knee injury would not allow him to dress in Game 5.

Game 5

In Game 5, the Pistons won their first championship since 1990, and Larry Brown finally won a professional title. The Pistons defense had overcome the high-scoring Laker offense, winning the game by 13, winning the series 4–1, and also ending a long Laker dynasty that lasted for many years. The Pistons' 100 points was the first (and only) time either team scored triple digits in the series. The game saw the end of Phil Jackson's first run as the coach—he returned in the 2005–06 season—and saw O'Neal, Payton, and Malone's last games in Laker uniforms.

This game also marked the end of Karl Malone's third and final attempt at winning an NBA championship. He went 0–3 in the NBA Finals.

Player statistics

Detroit Pistons

|-! style="background:#FDE910;"
| style="text-align:left;"|  || 5 || 5 || 38.4 || .509 || .471 || .929 || 3.2 || 5.2 || 1.2 || 0.0 || 21.0
|-
| style="text-align:left;"|  || 5 || 0 || 13.6 || .375 || .000 || .500 || 2.6 || 1.6 || 1.0 || 0.6 || 3.4
|-
| style="text-align:left;"|  || 4 || 0 || 2.5 || 1.000 || .000 || .000 || 0.3 || 0.0 || 0.0 || 0.0 || 0.5
|-
| style="text-align:left;"|  || 5 || 5 || 44.4 || .402 || .400 || .853 || 5.2 || 4.0 || 0.8 || 0.0 || 21.4
|-
| style="text-align:left;"|  || 5 || 0 || 13.0 || .294 || .250 || 1.000 || 1.4 || 0.8 || 0.6 || 0.4 || 3.6
|-
| style="text-align:left;"|  || 5 || 0 || 4.4 || .500 || .000 || .000 || 0.8 || 0.8 || 0.0 || 0.0 || 0.8
|-
| style="text-align:left;"|  || 3 || 0 || 1.7 || .000 || .000 || .000 || 0.7 || 0.0 || 0.3 || 0.0 || 0.0
|-
| style="text-align:left;"|  || 4 || 0 || 9.8 || .444 || 1.000 || .500 || 1.5 || 0.5 || 0.0 || 0.0 || 2.8
|-
| style="text-align:left;"|  || 5 || 5 || 39.2 || .389 || .188 || .455 || 6.8 || 2.0 || 1.8 || 0.4 || 10.0
|-
| style="text-align:left;"|  || 5 || 5 || 40.6 || .478 || .000 || .294 || 13.6 || 1.4 || 1.8 || 1.0 || 10.8
|-
| style="text-align:left;"|  || 5 || 5 || 30.2 || .453 || .250 || .778 || 7.8 || 1.4 || 0.4 || 1.6 || 13.0
|-
| style="text-align:left;"|  || 5 || 0 || 10.4 || .400 || .000 || .900 || 2.4 || 0.2 || 0.0 || 0.0 || 4.2

Los Angeles Lakers

|-
| style="text-align:left;"|  || 5 || 5 || 46.2 || .381 || .174 || .920 || 2.8 || 4.4 || 1.8 || 0.6 || 22.6
|-
| style="text-align:left;"|  || 3 || 0 || 7.0 || .167 || .000 || 1.000 || 2.7 || 0.0 || 0.3 || 0.0 || 1.3
|-
| style="text-align:left;"|  || 5 || 0 || 20.2 || .306 || .375 || .571 || 3.0 || 1.8 || 1.0 || 0.0 || 6.4
|-
| style="text-align:left;"|  || 3 || 0 || 10.0 || .571 || .000 || .000 || 1.0 || 2.3 || 0.0 || 0.0 || 2.7
|-
| style="text-align:left;"|  || 5 || 5 || 20.8 || .393 || .333 || 0.5 || 2.8 || 0.6 || 1.0 || 0.4 || 5.8
|-
| style="text-align:left;"|  || 4 || 4 || 30.5 || .333 || .000 || .667 || 7.3 || 2.3 || 0.3 || 0.3 || 5.0
|-
| style="text-align:left;"|  || 5 || 1 || 14.4 || .353 || .000 || .750 || 3.6 || 0.6 || 0.0 || 0.2 || 3.6
|-
| style="text-align:left;"|  || 5 || 5 || 42.6 || .631 || .000 || .491 || 10.8 || 1.6 || 0.4 || 0.6 || 26.6
|-
| style="text-align:left;"|  || 5 || 5 || 33.6 || .321 || .200 || .500 || 3.0 || 4.4 || 1.2 || 0.4 || 4.2
|-
| style="text-align:left;"|  || 5 || 0 || 15.6 || .318 || .250 || .000 || 1.0 || 0.4 || 0.2 || 0.0 || 3.6
|-
| style="text-align:left;"|  || 3 || 0 || 2.7 || .000 || .000 || .000 || 0.3 || 0.0 || 0.0 || 0.0 || 0.0
|-
| style="text-align:left;"|  || 4 || 0 || 19.3 || .385 || .167 || 1.000 || 3.0 || 4.5 || 1.5 || 0.5 || 3.3

Broadcast notes
The games were broadcast on ABC by Al Michaels and Doc Rivers. This was the first of two NBA Finals assignments for Michaels, better known as the voice of Monday Night Football at the time, while Rivers departed the booth after the series to become head coach of the Boston Celtics. Rivers was replaced by Hubie Brown the following season.

Brent Musburger and Jack Ramsay broadcast the Finals nationally on ESPN Radio. The finals were shown on Sky Sports in the UK and Ireland. In Canada, Leafs TV and RDS (in French) simulcast ABC, and Azteca 13 broadcast the Finals in Mexico.

To promote the series, the NBA used The Black Eyed Peas' song "Let's Get It Started", which it had also used throughout the 2004 NBA Playoffs.

Aftermath
The Pistons made the Finals again in 2005, losing to the San Antonio Spurs in a heavily contested seven-game series. The 2004-05 Pistons won 54 games and defeated the Philadelphia 76ers (5 games), Indiana Pacers (6 games) and Miami Heat (7 games) on their way back to the finals. However the Spurs, who played a defensive style similar to the Pistons' would defeat the defending champions in a tough fought Game 7. The Pistons would continue their run of Eastern Conference superiority in the ensuing three years; losing in the Conference Finals each time. After a particularly painful loss to the eventual champion Boston Celtics in the 2007-08 season, management would finally break up the core of the team and enter a period of losing seasons.

The Lakers' collapse became apparent in the days following the Finals. Head coach Phil Jackson abruptly resigned, Shaquille O'Neal was traded to the Miami Heat; Gary Payton was dealt to the Celtics, and Karl Malone was left unsigned, which subsequently resulted in Malone's retirement following the start of 2005–06 NBA season. The following 2004-05 NBA season was a tough one for the Lakers. Winning a mere 34 games and missing the playoffs for only the fifth time in the team's history, the Lakers' 2004-05 season was wholly forgettable. Jackson returned to the Lakers in the following offseason; despite penning a book dubiously entitled: The Last Season: A Team in Search of Its Soul, in which he voiced disdain for Kobe Bryant; calling him 'uncoachable'. Jackson and Bryant would quickly bury the hatchet once the season began; the duo, in the ensuing years would appear in three more NBA Finals; claiming two victories during those appearances.

References

External links

2004 NBA Finals Pistons vs. Lakers at Basketball-Reference.com

National Basketball Association Finals
Finals
NBA
NBA
2004 in sports in California
2004 in sports in Michigan
2004 in Detroit
2004 in Los Angeles
Basketball competitions in Detroit
Basketball competitions in Los Angeles
June 2004 sports events in the United States